Lake Imiria is a lake in Peru.

See also
List of lakes in Peru

References
INEI, Compendio Estadistica 2007, page 26

Inuria
Inuria